Eiconaxius is a genus of mud lobster that includes the following species:

 Eiconaxius acutifrons Bate, 1888
 Eiconaxius agassizi Bouvier, 1905
 Eiconaxius albatrossae Kensley, 1996
 Eiconaxius andamanensis (Alcock, 1901)
 Eiconaxius antillensis Bouvier, 1905
 Eiconaxius asper Rathbun, 1906
 Eiconaxius baja Kensley, 1996
 Eiconaxius bandaensis Sakai, 2011
 Eiconaxius borradailei Bouvier, 1905
 Eiconaxius caribbaeus (Faxon, 1896)
 Eiconaxius consobrinus (De Man, 1907)
 Eiconaxius cristagalli (Faxon, 1893)
 Eiconaxius demani Sakai, 1992
 Eiconaxius dongshaensis Poore & Dworschak, 2018
 Eiconaxius farreae Ortmann, 1891
 Eiconaxius gololobovi Poore & Dworschak, 2018
 Eiconaxius hakuhou Sakai & Ohta, 2005
 Eiconaxius heinrichi (Sakai, 2011)
 Eiconaxius indicus (De Man, 1907)
 Eiconaxius kensleyi Komai, Lin & Chan, 2010
 Eiconaxius kermadeci Bate, 1888
 Eiconaxius kimbla Kensley, 1996
 Eiconaxius kumejimaensis Sakai, 2014
 Eiconaxius laccadivensis Alcock & Anderson, 1894
 Eiconaxius malaku Poore, 2017
 Eiconaxius mallacoota Poore & Collins, 2009
 Eiconaxius mortenseni Sakai, 1992
 Eiconaxius parvus Bate, 1888
 Eiconaxius rubrirostris Komai, Lin & Chan, 2010
 Eiconaxius sibogae (De Man, 1925)
 Eiconaxius singularis (Zarenkov, 1981)
 Eiconaxius spiniger (MacGilchrist, 1905)
 Eiconaxius vaubani Poore, 2017
 Eiconaxius weberi (De Man, 1907)

References

Thalassinidea
Crustacean genera